Desarmillaria is a genus of fungi belonging to the family Physalacriaceae.

The genus has almost cosmopolitan distribution.

Species:
 Desarmillaria ectypa 
 Desarmillaria tabescens 
 Desarmillaria caespitosa

References

Fungi
Taxa named by Josef Herink